The Zinc Application Framework is an application framework, intended for the development of cross-platform software applications with graphical user interface (GUI), using a widget toolkit. Zinc targets both embedded (such as Wind River's VxWorks) and desktop platforms.

History
In 1990 Zinc Software released its first software development package Zinc Interface Library as a tool for Borland Turbo C++. This package allowed creation of text and graphics based user interface, initially only for DOS applications and since the 2.0 release also for Windows programs.

In 1994 Zinc Software introduced version 4.0 of its C++ tool under Zinc Application Framework name. Zinc aimed at cross-platform development of the user interface supporting DOS, Windows, Mac and Unix.

With the release of the version 5 in 1997, Zinc Software changed pricing policy and distributed "Personal Version" of the Zinc Application Framework free of charge for non-commercial use  - including source code and limited only by lack of technical support and distribution rights.

Zinc Software was acquired in 1998 by Wind River and continued to operate as a subsidiary.

In 2004 Zinc Software was sold to Professional Software Associates (PSA).

References

Further reading

External links
PSA Zinc Development — 2007
OpenZinc — open-source software project based on Zinc up to version 4.2

Widget toolkits